is an athletic stadium in Kōfu, Yamanashi, Japan.

It was formerly known as Yamanashi Prefectural Stadium until April 1988.

It hosted the 1954 Emperor's Cup, and the final game between Keio BRB and Toyo Industries was played there on May 25, 1954.

External links
Official site

Sports venues in Yamanashi Prefecture
Football venues in Japan
Kōfu, Yamanashi
Ventforet Kofu